Castel San Giovanni is a frazione of the comune of Castel Ritaldi in the Province of Perugia, Umbria, central Italy. Founded as a castle by Cardinal Gil de Albornoz in 1376, it stands at an elevation of 225 metres above sea level. At the time of the Istat census of 2001 it had 259 inhabitants.

References 

Frazioni of the Province of Perugia